Brittney Brimmage (born May 5, 1990) is an American female volleyball player.

With her club Iowa Ice she competed at the 2013 FIVB Volleyball Women's Club World Championship.

References

External links

1990 births
Living people
American women's volleyball players
Place of birth missing (living people)
African-American volleyball players
21st-century African-American sportspeople
21st-century African-American women
Missouri Tigers women's volleyball players